Lee Jeong-sook (born 15 December 1971) is a South Korean fencer. She competed in the women's individual and team foil events at the 1992 Summer Olympics.

References

1971 births
Living people
South Korean female fencers
Olympic fencers of South Korea
Fencers at the 1992 Summer Olympics
Asian Games medalists in fencing
Fencers at the 1994 Asian Games
Asian Games bronze medalists for South Korea
Medalists at the 1994 Asian Games
20th-century South Korean women